Ban Biao (3–54 CE), courtesy name, was a Chinese historian and politician born in what is now Xianyang, Shaanxi during the Han dynasty. He was the nephew of Consort Ban, a famous poet and concubine to Emperor Cheng.

Ban Biao began the Book of Han, which was completed by his son, Ban Gu and daughter Ban Zhao while their brother Ban Chao was a famous general who contributed his stories to expand the Book of Han. Ban Biao wrote an essay titled Treatise on the Mandate of Kings (王命論), which was influential on the Chinese concept of sovereignty and is included in Wenxuan.

Ban Biao and his descendants 
 Ban Biao (班彪; 3–54; father)
 Ban Gu (班固; 32–92; first son)
 Ban Chao (班超; 32–102; second son)
 Ban Xiong (班雄; ?–after 107; Ban Chao's eldest son)
 Ban Shi (班始; ?–130; Ban Xiong's son)
 Ban Yong (班勇; ?–after 127; Ban Chao's youngest son)
 Ban Zhao (班昭; 45–116; daughter)

See also
Book of Han

Notes

References 
 
 Book of Later Han, vol. 40, part 1.
 Zizhi Tongjian, vols. 33, 40, 41, 42, 44.

AD 3 births
54 deaths
1st-century Chinese people
1st-century Chinese historians
Han dynasty historians
Han dynasty politicians from Shaanxi
Historians from Shaanxi
Politicians from Xianyang
Writers from Xianyang